Winesap is an extinct town in Chelan County, in the U.S. state of Washington. The GNIS classifies it as a populated place.

A post office called Winesap was established in 1909, and remained in operation until 1944. An early variant name was Coles View.

References

Ghost towns in Washington (state)
Geography of Chelan County, Washington